The Kennedy half dollar is a United States coin that has been minted since 1964.  In the first year of production the coins were minted in 90% silver and 10% copper (90% silver).  From 1965 through 1970, the coins were minted in a clad composition of mostly silver outer layers and a mostly copper inner layer (40% silver).  After 1970, the coins are minted in a copper–nickel clad composition.  From 1992 to 2018, 90% silver coins were made for inclusion in special "Limited Edition" silver proof sets.  Beginning 2019 coins in the special silver proof sets are produced from pure (.9999) silver.

All coins minted in 1975 and 1976 for the United States Bicentennial bore the dates "1776-1976".  All 1970 and 1987 coins were issued only in special collector's sets (none released for general circulation).  Due to declining demand for half dollars, 2001 was the last year the mint issued half dollars for general circulation (business strikes). Beginning in 2002, the coins were minted in smaller numbers and sold only to collectors at premiums above the face value. In 2021, half dollars were once again shipped to the Federal Reserve and thus released for general circulation. 

For the 50th anniversary of the Kennedy Half Dollar, the mint issued a 3/4 ounce .9999 gold version bearing the special date of "1964-2014".

Mintage figures

See also

United States cent mintage figures
Lincoln cent mintage figures
United States nickel mintage figures
United States quarter mintage figures
Washington quarter mintage figures
50 State quarter mintage figures
America the Beautiful quarter mintage figures

References 

Fifty-cent coins of the United States